Sailing competitions at the 1987 Pan American Games were held at Lake Michigan in Michigan City, Indiana, United States.


Men's events

Women's events

Open events

Medal table

References

Events at the 1987 Pan American Games
Sailing at the Pan American Games
Sailing competitions in the United States
Michigan City, Indiana